The Nordic Chess Championship (Nordiska Schackkongressen) is a biennal chess tournament which determines the champion of the Nordic countries. The first edition took place in Stockholm in 1897.

History
The winners in the Nordic Championship in 1934 and 1936, Aron Nimzowitsch and Erik Lundin, got the Nordiske kongresmestre title, as the champion of 1930, Erik Andersen, defended his title with 3–3 against Gideon Ståhlberg at Copenhagen 1934 and lost it by 2½–3½ against Erik Lundin at Copenhagen 1937.

Several of the Nordic Championship have been arranged as part of an open tournament, where the best placed player from a Nordic country becomes Nordic champion even if that person did not win the event. For example, the Nordic Champion of 2011, Jon Ludvig Hammer, finished fifth in the Reykjavik Open that doubled as the Nordic Championship since the four players who finished ahead of him were from Ukraine, the Netherlands, and Poland and were thus ineligible for the Nordic Champion title.

Winners

References

Supranational chess championships
Chess in Denmark
Chess in Finland
Chess in Iceland
Chess in Norway
Chess in Sweden
1897 in chess
Chess in Europe
Inter-Nordic sports competitions